Martyna Dąbrowska (born  5 April 1994) is a Polish sprinter who specialises in the 400 metres. She won a bronze medal in the 4 × 400 metres relay at the 2017 World Championships in London, where she run in the heats. In addition, she was a reserve relay member at the 2016 Summer Olympics but did not run in the end.

Competition record

Personal bests

Outdoor

Indoor

References

External links

1994 births
Living people
Polish female sprinters
Sportspeople from Szczecin
World Athletics Championships athletes for Poland
World Athletics Championships medalists
Universiade medalists in athletics (track and field)
Universiade gold medalists for Poland
Medalists at the 2017 Summer Universiade
21st-century Polish women